Boum sur Paris, is a French comedy film from 1953, directed by Maurice de Canonge.

Plot

In the early 1950s, the popular radio program "La Kermesse aux Étoiles", hosted by the famous Jean Nohain, mixing lottery games and performances of various artists will be disturbed by the adventures of a man and his bride seeking to retrieve a dangerous perfume bottle (explosive) which was inadvertently mixed with prizes ...

Cast 

 Jacques Pills as Gilbert Sestrières
 Danielle Godet as Hélène
 Armand Bernard as Calchas
 Luce Feyrer as Lola Robert
 Gary Cooper as himself
 Annie Cordy as herself
 Édith Piaf as herself
 Juliette Gréco as herself
 Line Renaud as herself
 Gilbert Bécaud as himself
 Charles Trenet as himself
 Charles Boyer as himself
 Martine Carol as herself
 Andréa Parisy as herself
 Gisèle Pascal as herself
 Gregory Peck as himself
 Lucienne Delyle as herself
 Paul Demange as himself
 Marcel Mouloudji as himself

References

External links 
 

1953 films
French comedy films
1950s French-language films
French black-and-white films
Films directed by Maurice de Canonge
1953 comedy films
1950s French films